Katherine and Jacob Greenfield Hebrew Academy (GHA), founded in 1953, was the first Jewish day school in Metro Atlanta, Georgia, United States. It was located in Sandy Springs. GHA was also was the first Jewish day school in the country to be accredited by the Southern Association of Colleges and Schools (SACS), and has been honored twice as a National School of Excellence by the Council for American Private Education.

As of July 1, 2014, the school officially merged with the modern Orthodox high school, Yeshiva Atlanta, founded in 1971, and the combined school is called Atlanta Jewish Academy. In November 2017 it had a ribbon cutting for the opening of a $9 million,  addition to its Northland Drive campus in Sandy Springs.

Notable alumni

 Harris Barton (born 1964), All Pro NFL offensive lineman

See also
History of the Jews in Atlanta

References

External links 
 

2014 disestablishments in Georgia (U.S. state)
Educational institutions disestablished in 2014
1953 establishments in Georgia (U.S. state)
Educational institutions established in 1953
Schools in Sandy Springs, Georgia
Private elementary schools in Sandy Springs, Georgia
Private middle schools in Sandy Springs, Georgia
Private K–8 schools in Georgia (U.S. state)